Siddig El Tahir El Fadil El Siddig Abdurrahman Mohammed Ahmed Abdel Karim El Mahdi (born 21 November 1965) is a Sudanese-born English actor and director known professionally as Siddig El Fadil and subsequently as Alexander Siddig.

Siddig is best known for his roles as Dr. Julian Bashir in the television series Star Trek: Deep Space Nine, former terrorist Hamri Al-Assad in the sixth season of the series 24, Doran Martell in Game of Thrones, and Ra's al Ghul in Gotham. He also starred in the films Syriana (2005), Hannibal (2006), A Lost Man (2007), Cairo Time (2009) and Inescapable (2012).

Early life
Siddig was born in Omdurman, Sudan. His father, Tahir El Mahdi, was Sudanese; his mother, Gloria (née Taylor; d. 2001) was English. She was the older sister of actor Malcolm McDowell.

Siddig's parents met in the 1960s when his mother travelled to Sudan with a friend who introduced her to Siddig's father. Siddig's father was a student at Cambridge University in the 1950s and was proficient in English. Siddig's uncle Sadiq al-Mahdi was Prime Minister of Sudan from 19661967 and again from 19861989. Siddig is also the great-great-grandson of Muhammad Ahmad, a Nubian religious leader who was proclaimed the Mahdi by his disciples.

Siddig's mother remained in Sudan for three years and returned to London with Siddig and his father. Siddig was two years old at the time. Siddig initially spoke Arabic when he was a child, but by his second year of living in Britain he had forgotten much of it. In 1978 his mother married film director and producer Michael Birkett and in 1982 the two had a son together named Thomas. Siddig's mother worked as a model and theatrical press agent.

Siddig attended St Lawrence College, Ramsgate. He also studied geography and anthropology for a year at University College London before enrolling at the London Academy of Music and Dramatic Art (LAMDA).

Career
After leaving LAMDA, Siddig worked in theatre as both an actor and director. Siddig's first television role was a Palestinian man in a British six-part miniseries called The Big Battalions (filmed in 1989 but released in 1992) and shortly afterward he won the role of Prince Feisal in A Dangerous Man: Lawrence After Arabia, a 1990 telefilm sequel to Lawrence of Arabia starring Ralph Fiennes.

Siddig's role in A Dangerous Man: Lawrence After Arabia brought him to the attention of Rick Berman, executive producer of Star Trek: Deep Space Nine (1993). Berman originally considered Siddig for the role of Commander Benjamin Sisko, but decided in the end that Siddig was too young for the role and cast him as Dr. Julian Bashir.  Siddig remained with Deep Space Nine for all seven seasons of the series. He also directed the episodes "Business as Usual" (1997) and "Profit and Lace" (1998). In 1995 Siddig also changed his name from Siddig El Fadil to Alexander Siddig.

Siddig told Bidoun magazine that there was an increased demand for Islamic and Arabic character roles in both film and television after the September 11 attacks and that people began to approach him with projects within six months of the event. He played a mountain guide in the thriller film Vertical Limit (2000), starring Chris O'Donnell, and Ajay in the post-apocalyptic science fantasy film Reign of Fire (2002) starring Christian Bale. In 2003 Siddig played the role of an Algerian secret agent on the trail of Islamists in the controversial episode "Nest of Angels" of the British television show Spooks (known as MI-5 in the US). Siddig appeared in a cameo role as Khalid Sheikh Mohammed the film The Hamburg Cell that premiered the following year.

In 2005 Siddig returned to the live stage, playing the role of Doctor Scott in a production of Whose Life Is It Anyway? starring Kim Cattrall that played at the Comedy Theatre in London. That same year Siddig appeared as Saladin's aide Imad in Ridley Scott's 2005 film Kingdom of Heaven and starred alongside George Clooney and Matt Damon as Prince Nasir in the film Syriana.

Siddig played the title role in the BBC's 2006 tele-film Hannibal. In 2007 he starred in A Lost Man (French title Un Homme Perdu) a French language film that screened at the Cannes Film Festival. That same year Siddig played the role of former terrorist Hamri Al-Assad in the sixth season of 24.

In 2009, he co-starred with Patricia Clarkson in the award-winning film Cairo Time as Tareq Khalifa, an Egyptian who battles his attraction to his friend's wife. Directed by Canadian director Ruba Nadda, the film won the prize for "Best Canadian Feature Film" at the 2009 Toronto International Film Festival. He also played Jamal in Julian Schnabel’s 2010 film Miral.

Siddig played Philip Burton in series 4 and 5 of the ITV science-fiction drama programme Primeval; both series aired in 2011. In 2012, Siddig again worked with director Nadda and played the starring role as a Syrian-Canadian businessman in the film Inescapable, which also starred Marisa Tomei and Joshua Jackson.

In 2013 Siddig narrated the BBC Two nature documentary series Wild Arabia and played the role of Minos in the first series of the BBC fantasy-adventure programme Atlantis.

From 2013 to 2015 Siddig played Aslan Al-Rahim (aka "The Turk") in the BBC historical fantasy drama series Da Vinci's Demons. In 2015 and 2016 he appeared in the HBO series Game of Thrones; Siddig played the role of Doran Martell, the ruling Prince of Dorne, in the series' fifth and sixth seasons. He also played Reuben Oliver, an artist and suitor of Polly Shelby, in the third season of the British series Peaky Blinders. Siddig also provided the voice of Wolf, a character in the historical fantasy drama Tumanbay that aired on BBC Radio 4 between December 2015 and February 2016.

In 2017 Siddig joined the cast of the televisions series Gotham as League of Shadows leader Ra’s al Ghul and also played the part of Aristotle Onassis in the drama miniseries The Kennedys: After Camelot.

In 2019 he appeared in the Netflix series The Spy as Ahmed Suidani, a Syrian security officer. That same year he appeared as Issouf Al Moctar in the second season of the Fox (UK and Ireland) thriller series Deep State, and voiced Avi Singh in Star Wars: The Bad Batch.

Personal life
Siddig met Nana Visitor on the set of Star Trek: Deep Space Nine. Their son, Django El Tahir El Siddig, was born on 16 September 1996 and Visitor's pregnancy was written into the storyline of Deep Space Nine. Django is Siddig's first child and Visitor's second son. The couple were married in 1997 and divorced in 2001.

Filmography

Film

Television series

References

Notes

Citations

External links

1965 births
Al-Mahdi family
English male film actors
English male television actors
English male voice actors
Sudanese people of European descent
Alumni of the London Academy of Music and Dramatic Art
Living people
Hashemite people
English people of Sudanese descent
People educated at St Lawrence College, Ramsgate
Sudanese emigrants to the United Kingdom
Male actors from Kent
21st-century Sudanese male actors
20th-century Sudanese male actors